The Mariscal Luzuriaga Province (Spanish mariscal marshal)  is one of 20 provinces of the Ancash Region in Peru. It was created by law 12541 on January 12, 1956 and named after the Peruvian marshal and Argentine general Toribio de Luzuriaga 

Since the Inca roads crossed its territory up to the Ecuador, where its capital Piscobamba is located now, there was a strategic tambo during the Inca's time. Pisqu Pampa  means "bird plain" in Quechua. This place has a special attraction due to four mythical hills: Kampanayuq, Aswaq, Amañico and Wankash. Bloody battles were performed here by the armies of the Inca Tupac Yupanqui and the conchucos, piscopampas and huaras. See Garcilaso: "Comentarios reales" .

Geography 
Other mountains are listed below:

Political division
Mariscal Luzuriaga is divided into eight districts, which are:
 Casca 
 Eleazar Guzman Barron 
 Fidel Olivas Escudero 
 Llama 
 Llumpa 
 Lucma 
 Musga 
 Piscobamba

Ethnic groups 
The people in the province are mainly indigenous citizens of Quechua descent. Quechua is the language which the majority of the population (90.95%) learnt to speak in childhood, 8.51% of the residents started speaking using the Spanish language (2007 Peru Census).

50th Anniversary 
In 2006, this province arrived at the 50th anniversary of its creation, by Law No. 12541, dated at January 12, 1956; president of Peru, general Manuel A. Odría. For those date edit, por celebrate the 50 years of provincial life, the book "Libro de Oro Luzuriaguino", with participation of a pool of authors.

See also 
 Qanchisqucha
 Urqunqucha
 Wiqruqucha

References

External links 

Provinces of the Ancash Region